Lepidochrysops glauca, the silvery blue, is a butterfly of the family Lycaenidae. It is found from the African tropics to South Africa.

The wingspan is 35–40 mm for males and 38–48 mm for females. Adults are on the wing from September to December and from January to April. There are two generations per year.

The larvae feed on Ocimum canum and Lantana rugosa.

Subspecies
 Lepidochrysops glauca glauca
Range: Gabon, DRC, Angola, Tanzania, Malawi, Zambia, Zimbabwe, Botswana, Eswatini, South Africa: Limpopo, Mpumalanga, North West, Gauteng, Free State and KwaZulu-Natal provinces
 Lepidochrysops glauca swinburnei Stevenson, 1939
Range: Zimbabwe

References

Butterflies described in 1887
Lepidochrysops
Butterflies of Africa
Taxa named by Roland Trimen